Loch Dubh ("Black Loch") may refer to the following lochs in Scotland:

Loch Dubh, Loch Ard Forest
Dubh Loch, Glen Muick, in Aberdeenshire, Scotland